Will Claye (born June 13, 1991) is an American track and field athlete of Sierra Leonean descent who competes in the long jump and triple jump. He won a bronze medal in 2011 World Championships in Athletics and the gold medals at the 2012 IAAF World Indoor Championships and 2018 IAAF World Indoor Championships. In his Olympic debut at the 2012 Summer Olympics, Claye won a bronze medal in long jump and a silver medal in triple jump. He repeated his silver medal in the triple jump four years later.

Will was two-time Arizona Interscholastic Association high school champion in the triple jump, establishing a new state record of over 50 feet. He attended Mountain Pointe High School in Phoenix, Arizona, where he was named to the 2008 USA Today's All-USA Team in both jumps. Claye enrolled early at the University of Oklahoma, but later transferred to the University of Florida.

Will Claye later went on to record the rap song "IDGAF" with YG.

Career

College career
While attending the University of Oklahoma, Claye competed for the Oklahoma Sooners men's track and field team. During his second year at Oklahoma, Claye's performance dropped off due to stress fractures in his back and leg. After the 2010 outdoor season, he transferred to the University of Florida to join defending outdoor champion Christian Taylor and training under legendary jumps coach Dick Booth. The collegiate 2011 indoor season was capped by Florida winning the NCAA Indoor National Championship, thanks to Coach Booth's jumpers scoring 30 of the Gators' 52 points, led by Claye's national title in the triple jump and his runner-up finish in the long jump.

Claye finished second at the 2011 NCAA Men's Outdoor Track and Field Championships behind Taylor. The two went on to finish in the same order at the 2011 USA Outdoor Track and Field Championships. Claye finished his collegiate career at Florida, after his junior year, ending with eight "All American" honors and with two NCAA titles (the 2009 outdoor triple jump title and the 2011 indoor title); he won both the triple and long jumps at the 2011 SEC Championships.

2011 World Championships
In 2011 World Championships in Athletics in Daegu, South Korea, Claye was 9th in long jump and 3rd in triple jump. Claye, and Gator teammate Christian Taylor, withdrew from the University of Florida after the 2011 Worlds, and turned professional in order to concentrate on preparing for the 2012 London Olympics. He is sponsored by Nike and is training under the direction of Martin Smith.

2012 Olympic Year
He went on to claim his first world title at the 2012 IAAF World Indoor Championships. He won the triple jump ahead of Christian Taylor with a clearance of 17.70 m and also placed fourth in the long jump. In the outdoor season, he began with runner-up finishes at both the Shanghai and Eugene legs of the 2012 Diamond League.

At the 2012 London Olympics Claye first won the bronze medal in long jump, then followed up by winning the silver medal in triple jump five days later.
He is the first man to win medals in both the long and triple jumps at the same Olympics since Naoto Tajima of Japan at the 1936 Berlin Summer Olympics.

2013 World Championships
In 2013 World Championships in Athletics in Moscow, Claye triple jumped  (Wind: +0.5 m/s).

2015 World Championships
In 2015 World Championships in Athletics in Beijing, Claye triple jumped  (Wind: +0.2 m/s).

2016 Olympic Year
In Summer Olympics, Claye triple jumped  (Wind: +0.4 m/s) to earn a silver medal.

Major competition record

USA National Track and field Championships

Personal bests

All information taken from IAAF profile.

See also

Florida Gators
List of Olympic medalists in athletics (men)
List of University of Florida Olympians

References

External links

USATF profile for Will Claye
Oklahoma Sooners bio
Florida Gators bio
 University of Alabama 2012 bio for jumps Coach Dick Booth

Living people
1991 births
American male triple jumpers
American people of Sierra Leonean descent
Sportspeople of Sierra Leonean descent
Athletes (track and field) at the 2012 Summer Olympics
Athletes (track and field) at the 2016 Summer Olympics
Athletes (track and field) at the 2020 Summer Olympics
Florida Gators men's track and field athletes
Oklahoma Sooners men's track and field athletes
Track and field athletes from Phoenix, Arizona
Olympic silver medalists for the United States in track and field
Olympic bronze medalists for the United States in track and field
World Athletics Championships medalists
Medalists at the 2012 Summer Olympics
Medalists at the 2016 Summer Olympics
Medalists at the 2020 Summer Olympics
World Athletics Championships athletes for the United States
Olympic male triple jumpers
Sportspeople from Tucson, Arizona
World Athletics Indoor Championships winners
USA Outdoor Track and Field Championships winners
USA Indoor Track and Field Championships winners